The All-India Muslim League (popularised as the Muslim League) was a political party established in 1906 in British India. The first session of the party was held in Karachi in 1907. Muhammad Ali Jinnah joined the league in 1913. In 1927 the League was divided into two factions regarding the issue of a joint electorates. Those who supported the joint electorates were led by Muhammad Ali Jinnah (known as Jinnah League) and those who opposed were led by Sir Muhammad Shafi (Shafi League). In 1931 the party again split into two when Muhammad Ali Jinnah moved to London abandoning politics. The two factions were led by Abdul Aziz and Hafiz Hidayat. The two factions merged again when Jinnah returned to India in 1934. The last session was held in Karachi in 1943 and was presided by Muhammad Ali Jinnah.

List of party presidents

See also
 Pakistan Movement
 List of Pakistan Movement activists

References

All India Muslim League members